The village of Azakh was one of the few remaining pockets of resistance during the Assyrian genocide that the Ottoman authorities called the "Midyat Rebellion" named after Midyat, the largest Assyrian town in Tur Abdin.

Background
At the start of the 20th century, the Assyrian village of Azakh had a population of only 1000, and was inhabited by Syriac Orthodox and Syriac Catholic Christians. The mayor of the village was Hanna Makdisi Amno. The conflict began as Kurdish tribes and other local Muslim militias began to raid and destroy small Assyrian villages throughout Tur Abdin throughout the summer of 1915. Most villages were unprepared and fell quickly to the Kurdish raiders. Azakh was surrounded in mid-August.

In May 1915 many Assyrian families from surrounding villages as well as some Armenians sought protection from massacres, by July more than a thousand determined defenders had gathered in the village of Azakh. The "Jesus Fedai", was formed and defense works were built. The leader of the Azakh National Assembly who organized the resistance is named Işo Hanna Gabre, other members include: Tuma Abde Kette, Behnan Isko, Murad Hannoush, Andrawos Hanna Eliya, Yaqub Hanna Gabre and Behnam Aqrawi.

The Ottoman Empire was well aware that it was acting against populations that were not Armenians. In Ottoman documents the members of the Church of the East are called "Nasturi", the members of the Syriac Orthodox Church are called "Süryani" and the members of the Chaldean Catholic Church are called "Keldani". Despite the known fact that these villages were not associated with the rebelling Armenians Minister of Interior Talaat Pasha expressed suspicion about the loyalty of the Assyrian "Nestorians" in July 1914 and sent a deportation order to expel the Assyrians along the borderlands with Iran as early as October 1914. 

As the Assyrians armed themselves and put up a resistance Talaat Pasha sent the order to permanently drive them from the Hakkari mountains. Minister of War Enver Pasha ordered the suppression of Azakh using "utmost severity".

Defense and battle 
Azakh was attacked on August 18. This led to a counterattack by the village Fedayi led by Andrawos Eliya son of the village leader Hanna Eliya on the night of August 26, they managed to capture and destroy strategic positions of the Kurds who withdrew from Azakh on September 9 After suffering heavy casualties. However, the civil authorities would not give up their campaign to annihilate the Christians. The case of the conflict of Azakh was then passed from the civil officials and given to the military for them to handle. General Halil was deceitfully informed that “one thousand armed Armenians had gathered lately and started an assault destroying Muslim villages nearby and massacred their inhabitants” while he was passing through the area with an army division on its way to Bagdad, similarly to a secret Turkish-German expeditionary force tasked with infiltrating Iran lead by Ömer Naci Bey with the German contingent was led by Max Erwin von Scheubner-Richter. This expeditionary force of 650 cavalry and two pieces of field artillery was also diverted to Azakh as they were traveling in the same direction tasked with suppressing the rebels who were falsely accused of “cruelly massacring the Muslim people in the area.”

On October 29, 1915, Ömer Naci Bey requested reinforcements to assist with the siege.

The German contingent reacted negatively to this decision as Scheubner-Richter did not permit any of his German forces to participate. According to Paul Leverkuehn (his biographer) Scheubner-Richter was not convinced by the Turkish accusations, he was not convinced that this was a real rebellion. This topic was discussed by General Field Marshal Colmar Freiherr von der Goltz and the ambassador in Constantinople Konstantin von Neurath consulted with Chancellor Theobald von Bethmann Hollweg on how to react to the targeting of Ottoman Christian subjects in Anatolia. Neurath wrote:
The request of the Field Marshal was caused by the expedition against a number of Christians of Syriac confession that had been planned for a long time. They are allied with the Armenians and have fortified themselves in difficult terrain between Mardin and Midyat in order to get away from the massacres that the governor of Diyarbakir has organized. 
General von der Goltz decided to forbid all German military involvement in the siege of Azakh.

On November 7, the Ottoman army began their frontal assault on the village of Azakh, the assault turned out to be a failure with heavy losses. A surprise attack on  the Turkish camp took place on November 13–14. A large number of soldiers and officers were killed. This led to chaos among the surviving Turkish soldiers in the camp that lead to their flight. With this victory, the Azakh fedayi managed to capture large quantities of modern weapons that the Turkish soldiers left behind. As the Ottoman siege of the small village of Azakh had turned into a military fiasco as the hardened villagers put up a surprising resistance. On November 21 Ömer Naci Bey began to negotiate for a truce.

The Assyrian Syriac Christians of Diyarbekir Vilayet made significant resistance. Their strongest stand was at the villages of Azakh, Iwardo, and Basibrin. Fighting also took place in Midyat in early July, before succumbing with great loss of life. Fighting in Tur Abdin had begun in mid-June. Battles also took place in Basibrin (Haberli), Benabil (Bulbul), Beth-Debe, Hah, Hebob, Kerboran (Dergecit), and Zaz.

For month, Kurdish tribes and Turkish soldiers commanded by Ömer Naci Bey were unable to subdue the mostly Syriac Orthodox and Syriac Catholic Assyrian villagers who were joined by Armenian and other Assyrian refugees from surrounding villages. The leaders of the Azakh fedayeen swore We all have to die sometime, do not die in shame and humiliation and lived up to their fighting words.

Aftermath
After the end of World War I and the establishment of the Kemalist Turkish Republic, in 1927 the villagers of Azakh decided to hand over their weapons to the Turkish government after receiving reassurance for their security by the state. After the villagers were disarmed, Kemalist agents assassinated and imprisoned members of the Azakh National Assembly while the rest were hunted by the courts of Diyarbakir.

References

Assyrian genocide
History of the Assyrians
Tur Abdin
Military operations of World War I involving the Ottoman Empire
Armenian genocide
Armenian resistance during the Armenian genocide